Police Woman, released in the United States as Rumble in Hong Kong, is a 1973 Hong Kong action crime film written, produced and directed by Hdeng Tsu, who also co-stars in the film. The film stars Lin Chiu, Charlie Chin and Jackie Chan. The film is also known as Young Tiger.

The film was released in Hong Kong on 26 April 1973.

Plot
Chin Chen, a Hong Kong taxi driver, picks up Ho Mei Fong, a woman on the run from a gang of criminals. She dies suddenly and mysteriously in his back seat, but not before hiding her purse in the taxi. Now, the gang members begin to torment Chen, hoping he will hand over the purse, despite Chen being completely unaware of it.

Chen is visited by a woman claiming to Mei Fong's sister and looking for the purse. Days later, the dead woman's real sister, Police Inspector Ho Wai Ma, visits Chen and reveals that she had not spoken to her sister in years as she had become involved in the criminal underworld. The pair decide to team up to find Mei Fong's killers and bring them to justice.

The impostor turns out to be Sao Mei, who also works for the gang's evil boss. Chen witnesses her being kidnapped by the thugs and follows them to their hideout, joined by Wai Ma. However, both heroes are captured by the villains. Locked in a room together, Sao Mei reveals the truth to Wai Ma. The boss recruits attractive young women, such as Sao Mei and Mei Fong, to become drug smugglers for him. However, Mei Fong became desperate to escape and took photos of the mole-faced gang leader planting a car bomb which subsequently killed a man. The gangsters become aware of this and force her to drink poison. Secretly assisted by Sao Mei, Mei Fong escapes the hideout with the incriminating evidence hidden in her purse. Tragically, she did not make it to the hospital in time and died in Chen's taxi.

Chen, Wai Ma and Sao Mei manage to escape from their holdings and fight off their captors, then summon the police and Chen's fellow taxi drivers to their location. The criminals try to escape, but in a final brawl, Chen defeats the gang leader and retrieves Mei Fong's purse from his taxi. The evidence and the villains are then handed over to the police.

Cast
 Lin Chiu as Inspector Ho Wai-ma
 Charlie Chin as Chin Chen
 Jackie Chan as Mole Face Gang Leader
 Chin Hu as Ho Mei-fong
 Hdeng Tsu as Car Bomb Victim
 Fung Yi as Inspector Fung
 Helena Law as Taxi Dispatcher
 Cheung Ng long as Thug
 Mang Ding-goh as Thug
 Ho Gwong-ming as Thug
 Yeh Tien-hsing as Thug
 Li Wen-tai as Yuen Tai-heng
 Betty Pei Ti as Sao Mei
 Chiang Nan as Boss
 Go Yeung as Taxi Company Owner
 Michelle Yim as Girl harassed in park
 Yuen Cheung-yan as Extra / Stunt
 Chan Keung

Production
It is set and filmed in Hong Kong in 35 days on 8 June – 13 July 1972.

Home Media
American Home video companies like Xenon Entertainment Group and Madacy Entertainment released the film on video in the early 2000s as Rumble In Hong Kong. Clearly this was an attempt to capitalize on Jackie Chan's recent popularity in the west thanks to the release of Rumble in the Bronx and other films. 
 
On 17 September 2001, DVD was released by Prism Leisure Corporation at the United Kingdom in Region 2.

See also
 Jackie Chan filmography
 List of crime films of the 1970s
 List of Hong Kong films of 1973
 List of Hong Kong films

References

External links
 

1973 films
1973 crime films
Films shot in Hong Kong
Girls with guns films
Hong Kong crime films
Kung fu films
1970s Mandarin-language films
Police detective films
1970s gang films
1970s Hong Kong films